Gervase Alan de Peyer (11 April 1926 – 4 February 2017) was an English clarinettist and conductor.

Professional career
Gervase Alan de Peyer was born in London, the eldest of three children of Everard Esmé Vivian de Peyer, and his wife, Edith Mary ( Bartlett). He attended Bedales School, and was awarded a scholarship to the Royal College of Music, where he studied clarinet with Frederick Thurston and piano with Arthur Alexander. Towards the end of World War II, when he was aged 18, he joined the Royal Marines Band Service. He returned to the Royal College of Music after the war and subsequently studied in Paris with Louis Cahuzac.

In 1950 he was a founding member of the Melos Ensemble for which he continued to play until 1974. Their recordings of chamber music for both woodwinds and strings were reissued in 2011, including the works for larger ensembles which were the reason to found the ensemble, such as Beethoven's Septet and Octet, Schubert's Octet and Ravel's Introduction and Allegro, played with Osian Ellis (harp), Richard Adeney (flute), Emanuel Hurwitz and Ivor McMahon (violin), Cecil Aronowitz (viola) and Terence Weil (cello).

From 1956–73 he was principal clarinet of the London Symphony Orchestra. He was a founding member of The Chamber Music Society of Lincoln Center in New York in 1969 and played with them for 20 years.

He conducted the English Chamber Orchestra, the London Symphony Orchestra and the Melos Sinfonia; he directed the London Symphony Orchestra Wind Ensemble and was the associate conductor of the Haydn Orchestra. In 1959 he began teaching at the Royal Academy of Music.

De Peyer played first performances of concertos by Arnold Cooke, Sebastian Forbes, Alun Hoddinott, Joseph Horovitz, Thea Musgrave, Elizabeth Maconchy, William Mathias and Edwin Roxburgh. He premiered the Fantasy on an American Hymn Tune Op.70 for clarinet, cello and piano by Kenneth Leighton, commissioned by de Peyer, William Pleeth and Raphael Wallfisch and played by them at the Cheltenham Music Festival in 1975, and Miklós Rózsa's Sonata for Clarinet Solo op. 41 in New York in 1987.

Selective discography
 Judith Blegen & Frederica von Stade: Songs, Arias & Duets, with the Chamber Music Society of Lincoln Center, Columbia, 1975

References

Further reading

1926 births
2017 deaths
People educated at Bedales School
British classical clarinetists
Alumni of the Royal College of Music
Academics of the Royal Academy of Music
London Symphony Orchestra players
Place of death missing
20th-century classical musicians
Royal Marines personnel of World War II
Royal Marines Band Service
Military personnel from London
Royal Marines ranks